Black Colossus is a 1979 collection of two fantasy short stories written by Robert E. Howard featuring his sword and sorcery hero Conan the Barbarian.  The book was published in 1979 by Donald M. Grant, Publisher, Inc. as volume IX of their deluxe Conan set.  The stories originally appeared in the magazine Weird Tales.

Contents
 "Black Colossus"
 "Shadows in the Moonlight"

References

1979 short story collections
Fantasy short story collections
Conan the Barbarian books
Donald M. Grant, Publisher books